Brigitte Uttar Kornetzky (born 1959), is a German–Swiss Indie filmmaker. She directed the documentaries God No Say So, Where The Elephants Sleep, and Imagine, the Sky. Apart from being an independent filmmaker, Kornetzky is also an artist, musician, journalist and writer.

Kornetzky is the founder and President of the Swiss charity organization 'Elefanten in Not', as well as Swiss Ambassador for Captive Elephants at the Federation of Indian Animal Protection Organisation in India. Kornetzky has dedicated her life to protect elephants in captivity from torture and injuries. Through her organization, she conducts several elephant awareness programs and mahout training programs.

Personal life
She was born in 1959 in Germany. She has degree in art, music philosophy and law. She currently lived and worked in Switzerland since 1997.

Career
When Kornetzky visited India, she observed several captive elephants that were injured due to torture. With the information gathered during the visit, she later made the documentary Where The Elephants Sleep. 

In 2010, she made the indie documentary film God No Say So. After the success of that film, she made the documentary Imagine, the Sky. The latter deals with the life of pupils at the Milton Margai School for the Blind in Freetown, Sierra Leone, West Africa. In the film, she took part in seven different roles other than director: producer, editor, writer, cinematographer, sound editor, art director and composer. During the making of the documentary, she helped the people in Sierra Leone through her co-founded organization: 'A Grain of Change'. The film received critical acclaim and screened at several film festivals.

Filmography

References

External links
 
 WHERE THE ELEPHANT SLEEPS (99min): ein film von Brigitte Uttar Kornetzky

Living people
1959 births
German film directors
Swiss film directors